Belchamp Walter is a village and civil parish in Essex, England. It is near Belchamp St Paul and Belchamp Otten. The village is in the district of Braintree and in the parliamentary constituency of Braintree. The parish is part of the Stour Valley South parish cluster and has a population of 198 (2011 census).

Belchamp Hall is a country house in the village which stands near the church. It was the filming location for the fictional "Felsham Hall" in the "Lovejoy" television series.

References

External links

Villages in Essex
Braintree District